Thea Kellner (born 6 March 1914) was a Romanian fencer. She competed in the women's individual foil event at the 1936 Summer Olympics.

References

External links
 

1914 births
Year of death missing
Romanian female fencers
Olympic fencers of Romania
Fencers at the 1936 Summer Olympics